Paige Farries (born 12 August 1994) is a Canadian rugby union player. She plays at Wing for Canada and the University of Worcester Warriors.

Farries is originally from Red Deer, Alberta, but now lives on Vancouver Island. She played lacrosse for several years, but stopped playing in grade 11 due to the size and the physicality of the boys. While deciding what to do next, her high school’s rugby director invited her to try rugby. After giving it a try she became instantly hooked.

In 2020, She signed with the Worcester Warriors in the Premier 15s.

Farries competed for Canada at the delayed 2021 Rugby World Cup in New Zealand. She scored a try against the United States in their quarterfinal match. She also played in the semifinal against England, and in the third place final against France.

References

External links 

 Paige Farries at Canada Rugby

Living people
1994 births
Female rugby union players
Canadian female rugby union players
Canada women's international rugby union players